Citrus unshiu is a semi-seedless and easy-peeling citrus species, also known as miyagawa mandarin, unshu mikan, cold hardy mandarin, satsuma mandarin, satsuma orange, naartjie, and tangerine. Citrus unshiu was named after Unshu (Wenzhou), a famous production area of mandarin oranges in China, in the late Edo period of Japan. It is said to have originated in either Japan or China, and because of its name, it is often described as originating in China; however, due to multiple genetic studies conducted in the 2010s, the theory that the maternal species of Citrus unshiu was Kishu (Citrus kinokuni) and the paternal species was Kunenbo (Citrus nobilis Lour. var. kunip) and that it was created in the Satsuma province in Japan became more credible. During the Edo period, Kishu was the most popular because there was a popular superstition that eating Citrus unshiu (Satsuma) without seeds made people more prone to infertility. Citrus unshiu became popular in Japan after the modernization started in the Meiji period. It was introduced to the West from the Satsuma region of Japan in 1878.

Nomenclature 
In both languages, the name means "honey citrus of Wenzhou" (a city in Zhejiang province, China).

One of the English names for the fruit, satsuma, is derived from the former Satsuma Province in Japan, from which these fruits were first exported to the West.

The Afrikaans name  is also used in South African English. It came originally from the Tamil word , meaning citrus.

Classification 
Under the Tanaka classification system, Citrus unshiu is considered a separate species from the mandarin. Under the Swingle system, unshius are considered to be a group of mandarin varieties.  Genetic analysis has shown the Satsuma to be a highly inbred mandarin-pomelo hybrid, with 22% of its genome, a larger proportion than seen in most mandarins, coming from pomelo. It arose when a mandarin of the low-pomelo huanglingmiao/kishu variety (placed in C. reticulata by Tanaka) was crossed with a pomelo or pomelo hybrid, then the resulting cultivar was backcrossed with another huanglingmiao/kishu mandarin.

Characteristics 

Citrus unshiu is one of the sweetest citrus varieties. It is usually seedless, and is about the size of other mandarin oranges (Citrus reticulata). Satsumas are known for their loose, leathery skin; the fruit is very easily peeled in comparison to other citrus fruits. The rind is often smooth to slightly rough with the shape of a medium to small flattened sphere. Satsumas usually have 10 to 12 easily separable segments with tough membranes. The flesh is particularly delicate, and cannot withstand the effects of careless handling. Coloring of the fruit is often dependent on climate; satsumas grown in humid areas may be ripe while the skin is still green while those grown in areas with cool night temperatures may see a brilliant reddish orange skin at peak.

Satsumas are cold-hardy, and when planted in colder locations, the fruit becomes sweeter from the colder temperatures. Of the edible citrus varieties, only the kumquat is more cold-hardy. Satsumas rarely have any thorns, an attribute that also makes them popular. They can be grown from seed, which takes about eight years until the first fruits are produced, or grafted onto other citrus rootstocks, such as trifoliate orange.

History

United States of America 
Jesuits brought the fruit from Asia to North America in the 18th century, starting groves in the Jesuit Plantation upriver from New Orleans, Louisiana (then a part of New Spain). The municipal street "Orange" in New Orleans, was originally named "Rue Des Orangers" and the site of the Jesuit grove. The groves were later re-cultivated farther south in Plaquemines Parish to provide greater protection from harmful frosts, and have continued to the present day. The Becnel family are the largest growers of Louisiana citrus.

The fruit became much more common in the United States starting in the late 19th century. In 1878 during the Meiji period, Owari mikans were brought to the United States from the Satsuma Province in Kyūshū, Japan, by the spouse of the US Minister to Japan, General Van Valkenburgh, who renamed them satsumas. Between 1908 and 1911 about a million Owari mikan trees were imported throughout the lower Gulf Coast states. Owari is still commonly grown in Florida. The towns of Satsuma, Alabama, Satsuma, Florida, Satsuma, Texas, and Satsuma, Louisiana were named after this fruit. By 1920 Jackson County in the Florida Panhandle had billed itself as the "Satsuma Capital of the World." However, the commercial industry was damaged by a  cold snap in 1911, a hurricane in 1915, and a very cold period in the late 1930s.

Distribution 
Citrus unshiu is amongst others grown in Japan, Spain, central China, Korea, the US, South Africa, South America, New Zealand, and around the Black Sea.

Varieties 
Unshiu varieties cluster among the mandarin family. There are, however, some hybrids.

Possible non-hybrids
 Kishu mikan
 Ōgonkan or Ki-mikan
 Komikan

Hybrids 
 Amanatsu (pumello hybrid)
 Kinkoji unshiu (C. obovoidea(kinkoji) × C. unshiu)
 Kiyomi
 Dekopon is a kiyomi hybrid
 Kobayashi mikan (C. natsudaidai × C.unshiu)
 Shonan Gold
 Iyokan

References

External links 

 The Satsuma Tangerine – University of Florida
 PLANTanswers – Texas Cooperative Extension

unshiu
Fruits originating in East Asia
Japanese fruit
Medicinal plants of Asia
Chinese fruit